Celtic-language television channels are available in any countries, worlds, places, etc.

Irish language

Current channels

 : channel based in the Republic of Ireland and broadcasting to the Republic of Ireland and Northern Ireland.  has been successful in broadcasting Irish and increasing Irish speakers even though it has a limited budget.  is aimed  at young speakers of the language with youthful programmes.  is funded by advertising and the Government of Ireland with an annual budget of €40 million.
 : Irish-language children's channel broadcasting on Channel 602 on NTL as part of the  franchise. This is a simulcast of TG4 from 07:00 to 19:00.
  News Now: 24-hour live news service available on the  website. It offers a mix of Irish language, English language and Irish sign language TV news bulletins and political programmes.
It covers parliamentary debates in both Irish and English.
 BBC Two Northern Ireland: has its own Irish-language department producing some well-known programmes such as:
, (Promise Edge), a music programme for young people
, (Music Taste) a music programme
, (Cic is "punt", the rugby kick. It's a play on the English "Teenage Kicks"), a youth drama 
, (Into The Islands), a documentary 
, (The Dodais) a cartoon
, (Business Goal) an interior-decor show 
community programme , (The Community's Festival), community programme that is funded by the Irish Language Broadcast Fund which has been given £12 million over a five-year period.

Scottish Gaelic 

  ('BBC Scotland'): launched on 19 September 2008, the channel is available around the UK on Sky, Freesat and eventually Virgin Media also.

Welsh language 

 : channel broadcasting to Wales which has been successful in attracting new Welsh speakers. S4C is funded by the government of the United Kingdom and advertising.
 : was a channel which broadcast from the National Assembly for Wales.  was closed in 2010.

Breton language 
  ('TV Brittany'): channel broadcasting in the Brittany region of France. Programmes in Breton have all but stopped.
  ('France 3 West'): regional service of the national  channel, broadcasting mostly in French but with some local opt-outs in Breton.

See also
 List of Celtic-language media
 List of Irish-language media
 Celtic Media Festival

Celtic
Television